Reno is the name of some places in the U.S. state of Texas:
Reno, Lamar County, Texas, a suburb of Paris, Texas
Reno, Parker County, Texas